Proszynellus is a genus of spiders in the family Salticidae. It was first described in 2015 by Barbara Patoleta & Marek Żabka. , it contains 3 Australian species.

References

Salticidae
Salticidae genera
Spiders of Australia